Fun Trick Noisemaker is the debut studio album by The Apples in Stereo. It was recorded in a house in Los Angeles, in Robert Schneider's (at the time) portable Pet Sounds Studio. It was released in 1995 via SpinART.

The album is perhaps the most raw example of the Apples, with the rather lo-fi recording values being eclipsed somewhat by their later efforts. It is one of the band's most critically lauded albums.

Though the album is an early effort in production by Schneider, he had previously had experience producing with The Apples in Stereo and his own solo project, Marbles. Learning to be a record producer since he was fifteen years old, his influence from producers such as Phil Spector and Brian Wilson led him to use the popular "Wall of Sound" production technique on Fun Trick Noisemaker. Several tracks (notably the opening song "Tidal Wave") have as many as ten guitars playing at any one time (usually eight rhythm guitars and two guitars used for solos).

The Japanese version of Fun Trick Noisemaker contains the extra tracks "Shine (In Your Mind)" and "Thank You Very Much". These tracks can be found in mp3 format on the Elephant 6 website. They were later included on the 2008 b-sides and rarities compilation, Electronic Projects for Musicians.

Track listing

Personnel

The Apples in Stereo
As they appear on the sound recording:

Hilarie Sidney - drums, vocals, guitar, maraca, bells
Robert Schneider - vocals, guitars, piano, melodica, Jupiter and Moog keyboards, bass
John Hill - guitars, vocals, bass

Other performers
Jim McIntyre - bass on tracks 2, 4, 8 and 12
Kurt Heasley - guitar on track 3, vocals, tambourine
Joel Evans - bass on track 10
Jeff Mangum - bass on track 7
Kyle Jones - vocals

Production
Fun Trick Noisemaker was produced by Robert Schneider and engineered by  The Apples in Stereo with technical assistance from Kurt Heasley. The album was recorded on an 8-track analog from October 1994 to February 1995 at Brendt Larson's house (Glendora, CA) and Kyle Jones' house (Denver, CO). The LP was mastered by Paul Brekus, Aardvark Records. The CD was mastered by Park Peters, Audio Park.

The first track entitled "The Narrator" is an old 1960s recording describing the Relay 2 communications satellite. As described by Robert Schneider:

The cover art for Fun Trick Noisemaker is from prolific artist Steve Keene. Robert Schneider, familiar with Keene's work on a Silver Jews record, contacted Keene about doing the cover. Keene sent him several paintings (about thirty six), and the band picked eight for final production. The original CD packaging liner notes were printed in a manner that they could be unfolded and re-folded to show a different cover. The back cover art was done by William Cullen Hart.

References

External links 
Japanese bonus tracks in MP3 format
Album art and liner notes at Optical Atlas

1995 debut albums
The Apples in Stereo albums
SpinART Records albums
The Elephant 6 Recording Company albums